Key Food Stores Co-op, Inc. is a cooperative of independently owned supermarkets, founded in Brooklyn, New York, on April 20, 1937. Its stores are found in Connecticut, Massachusetts, New Jersey, New York, Pennsylvania, and Florida.  The headquarters for the Key Food cooperative is in Matawan, New Jersey; the Chief Executive is Dean Janeway. The cooperative also operates stores under the Key Food Marketplace, Key Fresh & Natural, Food Dynasty, Urban Market, Food World, Food Universe Marketplace, SuperFresh, and The Food Emporium banners.

In November 2015, the company completed the purchase of 23 stores from the moribund A&P, which was in bankruptcy (and about to shut down), bringing the total number of stores under its management to 212. The stores included the branches of Pathmark, A&P, Waldbaums, Food Emporium, and Food Basics USA. Two of the stores are to be operated under corporate rather than cooperative ownership (a first for the company). The acquisition made it the largest grocer in New York City. The primary supplier of both A&P and Key Food is C&S Wholesale Grocers.

In the 1970s and 1980s Key Food was involved with a trucking firm that committed tax fraud. Two directors, Camillo D’Urso and Pasquale Conte were also involved in mafia activity and heroin trafficking using pizza parlors as a front.

References

External links 

American companies established in 1937
Retail companies established in 1937
Companies based in New York City
Retailers' cooperatives in the United States
Supermarkets of the United States
1937 establishments in New York City